Pontevedra, officially the Municipality of Pontevedra (Capiznon/Hiligaynon: Banwa sang Pontevedra), is a 3rd class municipality in the province of Capiz, Philippines. According to the 2020 census, it has a population of 49,725 people.

Geography

Barangays
Pontevedra is politically subdivided into 26 barangays.

Climate

Demographics

Economy

References

External links
 [ Philippine Standard Geographic Code]
Philippine Census Information

Municipalities of Capiz